Macclesfield Forest and Wildboarclough is a civil parish in Cheshire East, England. It contains 28 buildings that are recorded in the National Heritage List for England as designated listed buildings. Of these, two are listed at Grade II*, the middle grade, and the others are at Grade II. Population in the parish is scattered, and most of the parish is farmland, moorland and forest. There are two small settlements at Wildboarclough and Allgreave, otherwise dwellings are scattered. The major house in the parish is Crag Hall; this and buildings associated with it are listed. Other listed buildings include farmhouses, farm buildings, churches, a terrace of houses, a bridge, a former post office with a telephone kiosk outside it, milestones, mileposts and parish boundary stones.

Key

Buildings

See also

 Listed buildings in Hartington Upper Quarter, Derbyshire
 Listed buildings in Leekfrith, Staffordshire
 Listed buildings in Macclesfield
 Listed buildings in Quarnford, Staffordshire
 Listed buildings in Rainow
 Listed buildings in Sutton
 Listed buildings in Wincle

References
Citations

Sources

 

Listed buildings in the Borough of Cheshire East
Lists of listed buildings in Cheshire